The Scorff River flows from central Brittany and enters the Atlantic Ocean on the south coast in Lorient.

The Scorff rises north of Langoëlan, in the Morbihan department, and flows through the towns of Guémené-sur-Scorff and Pont-Scorff. From there its bed enlarges to form a ria, submitted to the tides. It joins the Blavet in Lorient, where it enters the Ocean in the roadstead of Lorient.

Fauna
The river is classified for fishing as "first category"; it is home to Brown trout and Atlantic salmon.

References

Rivers of France
Rivers of Brittany
Rivers of Côtes-d'Armor
Rivers of Morbihan